Gavjellu (also Romanized as Gāvjellū and Gāv Jelow; also known as Gāv Chelū, Gav Jelo, Jūjalū, and Kūh Jālū) is a village in Saruq Rural District, Saruq District, Farahan County, Markazi Province, Iran. At the 2006 census, its population was 143, in 32 families.

References 

Populated places in Farahan County